White-eye bream (Ballerus sapa) is a fish species of the family Cyprinidae. It is widespread in many large rivers in Europe and Asia in drainages of the Black Sea, Caspian Sea, and Aral Sea. It was introduced to several rivers in northern Russia, the Rhine (in 1995), and the Vistula drainage system where it is invasive, coming from the Black Sea basin through the Dnieper–Bug Canal. Freshwater fish are up to 35 cm long.

References

External links

white-eye bream
Freshwater fish of Europe
white-eye bream